Ruso may refer to:

Ruso, North Dakota, city in McLean County, North Dakota, United States
Aaron ruso or Aaron Russo (1943–2007), American entertainment businessman, film producer and director, and political activist
Darko Ruso (born 1962), Serbian professional basketball coach
Ruso Flores or Andrés Flores (born 1990), Salvadoran footballer
Pamphila ruso, a butterfly in the family Hesperiidae

See also
Hruso (disambiguation)
Russo

it:Ruso
nl:Ruso